Aldar Batorovich Tsydenzhapov (4 August 1991 — 28 September 2010) was a seaman of the Russian Navy serving on the destroyer Bystry of the Pacific Fleet, who was the only fatal victim of a fire that broke out on the destroyer on 24 September 2010. He was posthumously awarded the Gold Star of the Hero of the Russian Federation for his role in extinguishing the fire and preventing an explosion.

Biography
Aldar Tsydenzhapov was a Russian naval volunteer, born on 4 August 1991 in Aginskoe, Russia. He was the youngest child in his family along with his twin sister Aruna. He had a brother named Bulat and a sister named Irina. His father Bator Tsydenzhapov is a retired law enforcement employee and his mother Biligma Tsydenzhapova is a kindergarten nurse. He graduated from high school in his hometown and would have gone to university. Instead, he decided to emulate his grandfather, Zydyga Garmaevich Vanchikov, and join the navy. The Russian navy rejected his application several times because he was underweight and too short, but he persisted and in November 2009 he was allowed to enter military service with the navy. He was stationed at the military unit number 40074 of the Pacific Fleet, stationed in Fokino, Primorsky Krai.

On 24 September 2010 a fire broke out on the destroyer Bystry while Aldar was working in the engine room near the boiler. A fuel pipeline burst in the engine room before the Bystry left the harbor and a fire broke out due to a spark from a short circuit. One of five mechanics in the engine room at the time, Aldar rushed to shut off the fuel supply to the boiler, preventing a potentially disastrous explosion. The valve Aldar closed was located inside the fire and he was badly burned during the roughly nine seconds that he spent working on the valve before rushing out of the room. Aldar was taken to the hospital of the Pacific Fleet in Vladivostok and died four days later on 28 September. He had less than a month to serve at the time of his death.

Aldar sacrificed himself to save the 300 crew members and the warship. His name is kept on the crew list of the destroyer Bystry and his bed is maintained and unused. He received a posthumous honor for the act.

Remembrance 

Aldar Tsydenzhapov Street in the village of Aginskoye was named after him.

 A street in the village of Ust-Ordynsky Ekhirit-Bulagatsky district of the Irkutsk region was named after him.
 A memorial plaque was installed at the school in the village of Aginskoye, where he studied.
 A memorial sign was unveiled at the home pier of the Bystry on the shore of Abrek Bay where ships of the Primorsky Association of the Pacific Fleet are based.
 In 2011, a monument was erected in the village of Selendum, Selenginsky district of Buryatia.
 In 2012, a postage stamp with a portrait of Aldar Tsydenzhapov was issued in the series “Heroes of the Russian Federation”.
 On 22 July 2015, the project 20380 corvette Hero of the Russian Federation Aldar Tsydenzhapov was launched at the Amur shipyard. On 25 December 2020, the corvette was commissioned into the Pacific Fleet.
 On 21 February 2015, a monument in the form of an anchor was erected on Aldar Tsydenzhapov Street in the village of Aginskoye.
 On 30 June 2016, a monument to Aldar Tsydenzhapov was unveiled in Ulan-Ude, built with money from students.
 On 13 October 2017, school 57 in Ulan-Ude was named after Aldar Tsydenzhapov.

Awards and tributes
 Hero of the Russian Federation (2011).
 Russian Navy Steregushchiy-class corvette Hero of the Russian Federation Aldar Tsydenzhapov is named after him. (2019)

See also
Other sailors who died while saving their ships:
 Francis Harvey
 Wilhelm Heidkamp

References

1991 births
2010 deaths
 Heroes of the Russian Federation
People from Aginsky District
Buryat people
 Accidental deaths in Russia
 Deaths due to ship fires
Russian Navy personnel